The Sarsanghchalak (IAST: Sarasanghacālaka) is the head of the Rashtriya Swayamsevak Sangh (RSS), an Indian right-wing, Hindu nationalist organisation that is widely regarded as the parent organisation of the Bharatiya Janata Party. The RSS is one of the principal organizations of the Sangh Parivar group. The organisation is the world's largest voluntary organization. The position is decided through nomination by the predecessor. Since the organisation was established in 1925 six people have served as Sarsanghchalak. The first, Keshav Baliram Hedgewar, founded the organisation served as Sarsanghchalak from 1925–1930 and then again from 1931–1940. The current Sarsanghchalak of Rashtriya Swayamsevak Sangh is Mohan Bhagwat.

List of Sarsanghchalaks

See also
List of presidents of the Bharatiya Janata Party
Swayamsevak

References

Rashtriya Swayamsevak Sangh
Sarsanghchalaks